XIAP-associated factor 1 is a protein that in humans is encoded by the XAF1 gene.

Function 

X-linked inhibitor of apoptosis (XIAP; MIM 300079) is a potent member of the IAP family. All members of this family possess baculoviral IAP (BIR) repeats, cysteine-rich domains of approximately 80 amino acids that bind and inhibit caspases (e.g., CASP3; MIM 600636). XIAP has 3 BIR domains and a C-terminal RING zinc finger that possesses E3 ubiquitin ligase (see MIM 601623) activity. XAF1 antagonizes the anticaspase activity of XIAP and may be important in mediating apoptosis resistance in cancer cells (Liston et al., 2001).[supplied by OMIM]

Interactions 

XAF1 has been shown to interact with XIAP.

References

Further reading